Nicholas Evlampios Fotiu (born May 25, 1952) is an American former professional ice hockey forward. He played in the World Hockey Association and National Hockey League between 1974 and 1988.

Playing career
Fotiu's father was of Greek descent, while his mother was of Italian descent. A left winger, Fotiu began his career in the World Hockey Association (WHA) with the New England Whalers in the 1974–75 season. Two years later, he signed with his hometown New York Rangers of the National Hockey League (NHL), where his role as an enforcer endeared him to Ranger fans. He was loved for his fighting style, which he picked up as a golden-gloves boxer, and he was the first New York City-born Ranger. Fotiu's popularity as a Ranger was enhanced by his willingness to throw pucks up into the Madison Square Garden "blue seats" after pre-game warmups, where previously he sat as a young fan. These seats were the least expensive and farthest seats from the action, far beyond where pucks would normally land during game play. Fotiu played with the Rangers until 1979, when he was claimed by the renamed Hartford Whalers in the 1979 NHL Expansion Draft. 

Fotiu's second tour with the Whalers ended when he was traded back to the Rangers during the middle of the 1980–81 NHL season, where he remained for five seasons. He was traded to the Calgary Flames in 1986 and helped them get to their first Stanley Cup finals appearance. Fotiu also played for the Philadelphia Flyers and briefly with the Edmonton Oilers before retiring from professional play in 1990.

Post-playing career
After retiring, Fotiu moved into coaching, and was most recently an assistant coach of the Hartford Wolf Pack. Fotiu runs a construction business and a charitable foundation, in addition to doing public relations for the Rangers.

Nick Fotiu has been inducted into the Staten Island Sports Hall of Fame. He is the first native of New York City to play for the New York Rangers.

Legacy
In the 2009 book 100 Ranger Greats, the authors ranked Fotiu at No. 100 all-time of the 901 New York Rangers who had played during the team's first 82 seasons.

Career statistics

Regular season and playoffs

References

External links
 

1952 births
Living people
American men's ice hockey left wingers
American people of Greek descent
American people of Italian descent
Calgary Flames players
ECHL coaches
Edmonton Oilers players
Hartford Whalers players
Ice hockey players from New York (state)
Johnstown Chiefs coaches
New England Whalers players
New Haven Nighthawks players
New Jersey Rockin' Rollers players
New York Rangers players
New York Rangers scouts
Philadelphia Flyers players
Sportspeople from Staten Island
Undrafted National Hockey League players